Mary Hawkins may refer to:
 Mary Louise Hawkins (1921–2007), American nurse who received the Distinguished Flying Cross
 Mary Ann Hawkins (1919–1993), American surfing pioneer
 Mary Ellen Hawkins (1923–2023), American politician, member of the Florida House of Representatives